Found (stylized as found.) is a 2012 American horror film written and directed by Scott Schirmer. It is based on the novel of the same name by Todd Rigney. The October People picked up the distribution rights in 2014 after the film screened at various film festivals.

Plot
12-year-old Marty tells the story of discovering his brother Steve is a serial killer when he took Steve's bowling ball bag and discovered a human head inside. Each week, Marty finds a new head, usually of a black woman, inside the bag hidden in Steve's closet. Marty keeps the discovery to himself, and immerses himself in a world of horror movies and comic books with his best friend David.

A black classmate named Marcus bullies Marty at school. Marty refuses to fight back, which leads to a rumor that Marty tried to kiss Marcus. Marcus is given detention while Marty is sent home.

Marty sneaks into his brother's room but finds the bag is empty. He turns on Steve's stereo and puts on Steve's rubber gas mask. Steve enters and yells at his brother for being in his room. He then learns that his brother did not stick up for himself during his fight with Marcus.

Marty's mom takes Marty to the video store to rent movies for a sleepover with David. When he tries to rent an empty box for a strange movie titled Headless, the clerk informs him that the tape is missing.

Marty goes through his brother's VHS collection and finds the tape of Headless that was stolen from the store. Inside is a paper noting certain times from the film. Marty and David watch the unrated movie, which turns out to be so graphic that it makes Marty uncomfortable, knowing his brother uses it for inspiration. David criticizes Marty for being a baby and says that he no longer wants to be Marty's friend because no one likes him. Upset, Marty forces David to look inside Steve's bag, where they find Marcus' severed head. He tells him that if David tells anyone, Steve will kill him. Horrified, David gets sick and his mother takes him home.

Steve realizes that his brother knows his secret and confronts him, demanding to be told how much he knows. He threatens Marty to keep quiet and later confesses that he only kills black people out of hatred for their race. He pledges that he would never harm his little brother. Marty struggles with how to handle himself and his brother's true nature.

Marty attends a church service with his mother and ends up beating Trevor, a classmate, after Trevor bullies him. He refuses to apologize, claiming that he is only sticking up for himself when no one else will. When Marty returns home, his father begins striking him over the altercation at church. Steve starts beating his father and pushing his mother before his father kicks him out of the house.

That night, Marty secretly meets with his brother outside. Steve asks for his help with an unspecified plan, but Marty refuses. As they argue, their father comes outside and Steve hits him with a shovel, and runs inside after his mother. Marty sees his brother preparing to rape their mother and tries to stop him, but is knocked unconscious.

Marty awakens tied to a bed with a ball gag in his mouth. He hears his mother screaming and crying in another room. Steve enters naked and wearing his gas mask, tells Marty to be quiet, grabs a machete, and proceeds to kill their parents. He comes back into the room completely covered in blood. Steve tells Marty that he will explain everything in the morning, but Marty only cries. Marty's reaction drives Steve mad.

In the morning, Steve walks out of the house, still covered in blood. Marty wakes, still tied up, to find himself surrounded by the mutilated bodies of his dead parents. He wonders if he'll ever be found.

Cast
 Gavin Brown : Martin ″Marty″
 Ethan Philbeck : Steve
 Phyllis Munro : Mother
 Louie Lawless : Father

Reception

The film received mixed to positive reviews. Patrick Dolan of Rue Morgue wrote that "[a]lthough this coming-of-age tale starts off as a morbid love letter to horror's past (like a 1990s version of Joe Dante’s Matinee), it cleverly turns into an honest-to-goodness horror film part-way through and unleashes some serious scares." Bloody Disgusting also praised the film, which they felt made the most of its low budget and "impresses on a variety of levels".

Censorship
Found was banned in Australia by the Australian Classification Board for "prolonged and detailed depictions of sexualised violence". The film was later released on DVD with an R18+ rating after two minutes were cut. The United Kingdom DVD release has 98 seconds cut. So far only the US “Unrated” DVD and Blu-Ray release and the Austrian “Limited Uncut Collector’s Edition” containing both DVD and Blu-ray are uncut.

Headless

It was announced in July 2014 that Headless, the film within a film from Found, was being made into a full-length film. Arthur Cullipher, the special effects supervisor and associate producer on Found, is set to direct. The film was funded by donors from Kickstarter, and the first festival screening was in February 2015 in Indianapolis.

References

External links
 
 

2012 films
2012 horror films
American independent films
American serial killer films
Films about racism in the United States
Films based on American novels
Censored films
Film controversies in Australia
Obscenity controversies in film
2010s English-language films
2010s American films